Ezio Sella (born 11 April 1956) is an Italian football coach and former professional player.

During his playing career he played for Viterbese, Fiorentina, Brescia, Sampdoria, Verona, Bologna, Arezzo, Ancona, Civitavecchia and Lodigiani. After retiring from playing in 1989 he has managed Roma and Palermo, guiding the rosanero to win the Serie C1 title during his two-week time in Sicily.

In November 2009 he joined Siena as assistant of newly appointed boss Alberto Malesani. He successively followed Malesani also at Bologna.

References

External links
Player profile at FootballPlus.com

1956 births
Living people
Footballers from Rome
Italian footballers
Association football forwards
Serie A players
Serie B players
U.S. Viterbese 1908 players
ACF Fiorentina players
Brescia Calcio players
U.C. Sampdoria players
Hellas Verona F.C. players
Bologna F.C. 1909 players
S.S. Arezzo players
A.C. Ancona players
A.S.D. Civitavecchia 1920 players
A.S. Lodigiani players
Italian football managers
Serie A managers
A.S. Roma managers
Palermo F.C. managers